The 1992 congressional elections in New Hampshire were held on November 3, 1992. They determined who would represent the state of New Hampshire in the United States House of Representatives. Representatives are elected for two-year terms; those elected served in the 103rd Congress from January 1993 until January 1995.  New Hampshire has two seats in the House, apportioned according to the 1990 United States Census.

Overview

District 1

District 2

References

1992
New Hampshire
1992 New Hampshire elections